The château de Neuilly is a former château in Neuilly-sur-Seine, France. Its estate covered a vast 170-hectare park called "parc de Neuilly" which comprised all of Neuilly that is today to be found between avenue du Roule and the town of Levallois-Perret. It was built in 1751, and largely destroyed in 1848, except for one wing which was integrated into a new convent building in 1907.

History

Ancien Regime
The parc was at some point divided into two very unequal parts, on which two châteaux were built :
 the château de Villiers to the east, seems to have only been a bourgeoise "grande maison", despite having 24 rooms and a beautiful garden divided from the parc de Neuilly proper by a palisade.  It was subsumed back into the parc in the first years of the 19th century ;
 the château de Neuilly, to the west, was built in 1751, on the site of a mid-17th century building, for comte d'Argenson, Secretary of State for War to Louis XV, who had acquired the property in 1741.  Decorated in the Ionic order and raised on several terraces looking out over the Seine, the new building was the work of architect Jean-Sylvain Cartaud.

French Revolution
After the French Revolution, the château de Neuilly belonged to Radix de Sainte-Foy, who sold it early in 1792 to Madame de Montesson. Under the French Consulate, she sold it to the businessmen Delannoy and Vandenberghe who rented it as a secondary residence to Talleyrand (who held magnificent fêtes there) before selling it to Murat at the start of 1804. Murat also acquired the château de Villiers and reunited the two estates, carrying out important works and expansions (notably adding two wings to the main château and holding sumptuous fêtes there, including one on the occasion of Napoleon I's coronation as king of Italy in 1805). Murat became king of Naples (1808), and all his goods reverted to being Imperial crown lands.  Princess Pauline Borghèse, Napoleon's sister, thus received the property as a "dotation" and also held great fêtes there. In 1814, the estate reverted to the restored Bourbon crown.

July Monarchy
On 16 July 1819, the estate was acquired by the duc d'Orléans, the future Louis-Philippe I, in exchange for écuries called "de Chartres", situated on rue Saint-Thomas du Louvre, which he owned. He appointed Henri Antoine Jacques as head gardener and had Pierre-François-Léonard Fontaine transform the château. He also expanded the estate by acquiring 7 islets in the middle of the Seine and linking them to the château by an iron-wire bridge so as to be able to reach the island now known as the île d'Amour (Isle of Love).  To that island he transferred the "Temple of Love" which his father Philippe-Égalité, when duc de Chartres, had built in 1774 in Paris's Parc Monceau (also known as the "Folie de Chartres") (V arrondissement, Île de la Jatte).

The House of Orléans especially liked the château de Neuilly, using it as their summer residence – with its long, low buildings, it provided a discretion suitable to this bourgeoise monarchy.  The parc, mostly wooded, was surrounded by a high fortified wall which kept out prying eyes.  It was the birthplace of three of Louis-Philippe's children – Clémentine, François and Antoine.

1848 and after
During the Revolution of 1848, the château was burned and pillaged on 25 February 1848.  All that survived was the north wing built by Murat, now occupied by the Congregation of the Sœurs Saint-Thomas de Villeneuve (52, boulevard d'Argenson). Confiscated by Napoleon III in 1852 with the goods of the House of Orléans, the parc was divided into 700 lots which, after the creation of seven 30 metre-wide boulevards and nine streets limited to 15 metres wide, were sold in successive auctions from 1854.

References

1751 establishments in France
Houses completed in 1751
July Monarchy
Neuilly
Royal residences in France
Joachim Murat